Perosinho is a former civil parish in the municipality of Vila Nova de Gaia, Portugal. In 2013, the parish merged into the new parish Serzedo e Perosinho. The population in 2011 was 6,359, in an area of 5.29 km².

References

Former parishes of Vila Nova de Gaia